Sarkha or Sorkha may refer to:
 Shahrak-e Sarkhadh
 Sarkha-ye Pain